Opal Peak is a  mountain summit located northeast of the northern end of Maligne Lake in Jasper National Park, in the Canadian Rockies of Alberta, Canada.


Climate

Based on the Köppen climate classification, Opal Peak is located in a subarctic climate zone with cold, snowy winters, and mild summers.

See also

List of mountains of Canada
Geology of the Rocky Mountains

References

Gallery

External links
 Parks Canada web site: Jasper National Park

Two-thousanders of Alberta
Mountains of Jasper National Park
Canadian Rockies